Silver Lake Historic District may refer to:

Silver Lake District, list on the National Register of Historic Places (NRHP) in Harrisville, New Hampshire
Silver Lake Historic District (Silver Lake, Indiana), listed on the NRHP in Kosciusko County, Indiana
Silver Lake Historic District (Harding, New Jersey), listed on the NRHP in Morris County, New Jersey
Silver Lake Institute Historic District, listed on the NRHP in Wyoming County, New York